The Brinell scale  characterizes the indentation hardness of materials through the scale of penetration of an indenter, loaded on a material test-piece. It is one of several definitions of hardness in materials science.

History
Proposed by Swedish engineer Johan August Brinell in 1900, it was the first widely used and standardised hardness test in engineering and metallurgy. The large size of indentation and possible damage to test-piece limits its usefulness. However, it also had the useful feature that the hardness value divided by two gave the approximate UTS in ksi for steels. This feature contributed to its early adoption over competing hardness tests.

Test details
The typical test uses a  diameter steel ball as an indenter with a  force. For softer materials, a smaller force is used; for harder materials, a tungsten carbide ball is substituted for the steel ball. The indentation is measured and hardness calculated as:

where:
BHN = Brinell Hardness Number (kgf/mm)
P = applied load in kilogram-force (kgf)
D = diameter of indenter (mm)
d = diameter of indentation (mm)

Brinell hardness is sometimes quoted in megapascals; the Brinell hardness number is multiplied by the acceleration due to gravity, 9.80665 m/s2, to convert it to megapascals.

The BHN can be converted into the ultimate tensile strength (UTS), although the relationship is dependent on the material, and therefore determined empirically. The relationship is based on Meyer's index (n) from Meyer's law. If Meyer's index is less than 2.2 then the ratio of UTS to BHN is 0.36. If Meyer's index is greater than 2.2, then the ratio increases.

BHN is designated by the most commonly used test standards (ASTM E10-14 and ISO 6506–1:2005) as HBW (H from hardness, B from brinell and W from the material of the indenter, tungsten (wolfram) carbide). In former standards HB or HBS were used to refer to measurements made with steel indenters.

HBW is calculated in both standards using the SI units as

where:
F = applied load (newtons)
D = diameter of indenter (mm)
d = diameter of indentation (mm)

Common values 
When quoting a Brinell hardness number (BHN or more commonly HB), the conditions of the test used to obtain the number must be specified. The standard format for specifying tests can be seen in the example "HBW 10/3000". "HBW" means that a tungsten carbide (from the chemical symbol for tungsten or from the Spanish/Swedish/German name for tungsten, "Wolfram") ball indenter was used, as opposed to "HBS", which means a hardened steel ball. The "10" is the ball diameter in millimeters. The "3000" is the force in kilograms force.

The hardness may also be shown as XXX HB YYD2. The XXX is the force to apply (in kgf) on a material of type YY (5 for aluminum alloys, 10 for copper alloys, 30 for steels). Thus a typical steel hardness could be written: 250 HB 30D2. It could be a maximum or a minimum.

Standards
 International (ISO) and European (CEN) Standard
 
 
 
 
 US standard (ASTM International)

See also
Brinelling
Hardness comparison
Knoop hardness test
Leeb rebound hardness test
Rockwell scale
Vickers hardness test

References

External links 
Brinell Hardness Test – Methods, advantages, disadvantages, applications

Rockwell to Brinell conversion chart (Brinell, Rockwell A,B,C)
Struers hardness conversion table (Vickers, Brinell, Rockwell B,C,D)
Brinell Hardness HB conversion chart (MPa, Brinell, Vickers, Rockwell C)

Hardness tests
Dimensionless numbers
Scales

de:Härte#Härteprüfung nach Brinell